Real Monarchs is a professional soccer club playing in the MLS Next Pro, a third division league of American soccer. The team is owned by, and operates as the reserve team of, the Major League Soccer club Real Salt Lake. While the senior club is based, and plays, in Rio Tinto Stadium, Sandy, Utah, Real Monarchs SLC are based in the Real Salt Lake training facility in Herriman, Utah, playing out of Zions Bank Stadium.

In 2017, Real Monarchs won the USL Regular Season Championship, the equivalent in the second division of the Supporters Shield. In 2019, Real Monarchs won their first outright USL Championship, defeating two-time champions Louisville City FC 3–1 at Dr. Mark & Cindy Lynn Stadium, Louisville, Kentucky. The Monarchs are the second MLS reserve team, after New York Red Bulls II to win the second division title, and the first to do so as USL Championship Western Conference champion.

As a fully owned MLS affiliate of Real Salt Lake, Real Monarchs do not enter the U.S. Open Cup.

History

RSL Academy coach Freddy Juarez was named Head Coach on December 23, 2014. The Monarchs played the LA Galaxy II to a scoreless draw in their USL debut on March 22, 2015 in Carson, California.

At the end of the 2016 season, Freddy Juarez was promoted to be an assistant coach for the Monarchs' parent team, Real Salt Lake and Mike Petke was brought in as his replacement along with Mark Briggs and Jamison Olave as his assistants. On March 29, 2017, Petke was promoted to Real Salt Lake's head coach following the dismissal of Jeff Cassar, and Briggs was announced as his replacement.

On June 19, 2017, the Real Monarchs broke the All-Time USL Record with nine consecutive victories by beating Reno 1868 2–1 at Rio Tinto Stadium.

The club won their first ever trophy on October 7, 2017, claiming the USL's regular season title with a 1–1 draw against Whitecaps FC 2.

The 2018 Season finished with a first round playoff exit after Head Coach Mark Briggs was replaced by interim coach Jamison Olave.

Prior to the 2019 season, Martin Vasquez was named head coach.  Vasquez resigned from the head coaching position on July 1, 2019.  Jamison Olave took over once again as interim coach.

On July 13, 2019, Douglas Martinez Jr. recorded the club's first ever hat trick in a 5-0 win over Tacoma Defiance at Zions Bank Stadium.

On November 9, 2019, Monarchs won the 2019 Western Conference Championship and advanced to the USL Championship finals for the first time in club's history by defeating the El Paso Locomotive FC 2–1 in extra time. On November 17, Real Monarchs won their first USL Championship, defeating two-time champions Louisville City FC 3–1 at Dr. Mark and Cindy Lynn Stadium. The Monarchs were the second MLS reserve team, after New York Red Bulls II to win the second division title.

MLS Next Pro
The club announced on December 6, 2021, that it was joining the inaugural 21-team MLS Next Pro season starting in 2022.

Stadium

In 2018, Real Monarchs began playing home matches at Zions Bank Stadium, a 5,000-seat soccer-specific stadium in Herriman. The stadium is adjacent to the training facilities and academy for Real Salt Lake.

Real Monarchs played their first three seasons at Rio Tinto Stadium in Sandy, the 20,000-seat home of Real Salt Lake.

Players and staff

Current roster

Technical & coaching staff
{| class="wikitable sortable"
|-
! style="background:#000060; color:#FCD401;" scope="col"|Title
! style="background:#000060; color:#FCD401;" scope="col"|Name
|-

Head coaches

Honors
 USL Championship Cup 
Winners: 2019
USL Regular Season
Winners: 2017
Western Conference
Winners (Regular season): 2017
Winners (Playoffs): 2019
Four Corners Cup
Winners: 2019

All-time top goalscorers

 Players in bold are still active with Real Monarchs; includes all competitive matches.
Includes regular season and playoffs.
As of November 12, 2019.

Record
'Year-by-year'

Broadcasting 
As part of their broadcast rights with its parent team, KMYU (TV) and the KSL website and apps (streaming) have occasionally aired Monarchs matches. All games are broadcast on ESPN+ as part of the USL Championship's deal with ESPN. The team's current broadcasters are Landon Southwick (Play-by-Play) and David Horst (Color).They host the Center Circle podcast. The official podcast of the Real Monarchs.

Supporters 
The Wasatch Legion is the official Supporters Group for the Monarchs.  The group stands behind the North Goal at Zions Bank Stadium.

References

External links
 Official Site
 Official USL site

 
MLS Next Pro teams
Former USL Championship teams
Association football clubs established in 2014
Professional sports teams in Utah
Real Salt Lake
2014 establishments in Utah
Soccer clubs in Utah
Soccer clubs in Salt Lake City
Reserve soccer teams in the United States